Sävsjö BK was a bandy club in Sävsjö, Sweden, established in 1971. Jonas Claesson played for the team, debuting in Division 2 as a 13 years old. before switching to Vetlanda BK at age 14.

The women's team has played two seasons in the Swedish top division., 1972/1973 and 1973/1974.

References

1971 establishments in Sweden
Defunct bandy clubs in Sweden
Sport in Jönköping County
Bandy clubs established in 1971